The 1999 Egger Tennis Festival singles was the singles event of the 29th edition of the Egger Tennis Festival; a Tier IV tournament and the second most prestigious women's tennis event held in Austria. Patty Schnyder, the defending champion, was upset in the first round by qualifier Lenka Němečková.

Karina Habšudová defeated in the final Silvija Talaja, in three sets, to win her first WTA title after three finals.

Seeds

Draw

Finals

Top half

Bottom half

Qualifying

Seeds

Qualifiers

Qualifying draw

First qualifier

Second qualifier

Third qualifier

Fourth qualifier

References
 ITF singles results page

Singles
Egger Tennis Festival - Singles
1999 in Austrian tennis